State Road 18 (NM 18) is a state highway in the US state of New Mexico. NM 18's southern terminus is a continuation as Texas State Highway 18 (SH 18) south-southeast of Jal, and the northern terminus is at U.S. Route 82 and NM 83 in Lovington.

Major intersections

See also

 List of state roads in New Mexico

References

External links

018
Transportation in Lea County, New Mexico